Balto is a 1995 animated adventure film directed by Simon Wells, produced by Amblin Entertainment and distributed by Universal Pictures. The film, which stars the voices of Kevin Bacon, Bridget Fonda, Jim Cummings, Phil Collins and Bob Hoskins, is loosely based on the true story of the eponymous dog who helped save children infected with diphtheria in the 1925 serum run to Nome. Though primarily an animated film, it uses a live-action framing device that takes place in New York City's Central Park and features Miriam Margolyes.

Balto was the third and final feature produced by Steven Spielberg's UK-based Amblimation studio before it became DreamWorks Animation, which would later be acquired by Universal's parent company NBCUniversal in 2016. Although the film was a major financial disappointment (it was overshadowed by the success of Pixar's Toy Story), its subsequent sales on home video led to two direct-to-video sequels: Balto II: Wolf Quest (2002) and Balto III: Wings of Change (2005), though none of the original voice cast reprised their roles.

Plot 

In New York City, an elderly woman and her granddaughter are walking through Central Park, looking for a memorial statue. As they seat themselves for a rest, the grandmother recounts a story about Nome, Alaska.

In 1925, Balto, a wolfdog hybrid, lives on the outskirts of Nome with his adoptive father, a Russian snow goose named Boris, and two polar bears, Muk and Luk. Being a half-breed, Balto is ridiculed by dogs and humans alike. His only friend in town is a red husky named Jenna who Balto has a crush on and is challenged by the town's favorite sled dog, Steele, a fierce and arrogant Alaskan Malamute.

That night, all the children, including Jenna's owner, Rosy, fall ill with diphtheria. Severe winter weather conditions prevent medicine from being brought by air or sea from Anchorage, and the closest rail line ends in Nenana after authorization to transport the antitoxin by rail is given by the Governor of Alaska in Juneau. A dog race is held to determine the best-fit dogs for a sled dog team to get the medicine. Balto enters and wins, but Steele exposes his wolf-dog heritage, resulting in him being disqualified. The team departs that night with Steele in the lead and picks up the medicine successfully, but on the way back, conditions deteriorate and the disoriented team ends up stranded at the base of a steep slope with the musher knocked unconscious.

When the word reaches Nome, Balto sets out in search of them with Boris, Muk and Luk. On the way, they are attacked by a huge grizzly bear, but Jenna, who followed their tracks, intervenes. The bear pursues Balto out onto a frozen lake, where it falls through the ice and drowns, while Muk and Luk save Balto from a similar fate. However, Jenna is injured and cannot continue on. Balto instructs Boris and the polar bears to take her back home while he continues on alone. Balto eventually finds the team, but Steele refuses his help and attacks him until he loses his balance and falls off a cliff. Balto takes charge of the team, but an unrelenting Steele throws them off the trail and they lose their way again. While attempting to save the medicine from falling down a cliff, Balto himself falls.

Back in Nome, Jenna is explaining Balto's mission to the other dogs when Steele returns, claiming the entire team, including Balto, is dead. However, Jenna sees through his deception and assures Balto will return with the medicine. Using a trick Balto showed her earlier, she places broken colored glass bottles on the outskirts of town and shines a lantern on them to simulate the lights of an aurora, hoping it will help guide Balto home. When Balto regains consciousness, he is ready to give up hope, but when a large, white wolf appears and he notices the medicine crate still intact nearby, he realizes that his part-wolf heritage is a strength, not a weakness, and drags the medicine back up the cliff to the waiting team. Using his advanced senses, Balto is able to filter out the false markers Steele created.

After encountering further challenges, and losing only one vial, Balto and the sled team finally make it back to Nome. A pity-playing Steele is exposed as a liar and abandoned by the other dogs, ruining his reputation. Reunited with Jenna and his friends, Balto earns respect from both the dogs and the humans. He visits a cured Rosy, who thanks him for saving her. Back in the present day, the elderly woman and her granddaughter finally find the memorial commemorating Balto, and she explains that the Iditarod trail covers the same path that Balto and his team took from Nenana to Nome. The woman, who is actually Rosy, repeats the same line, "Thank you, Balto. I would have been lost without you," before walking off to join her granddaughter and her Siberian Husky, Blaze. The Balto statue stands proudly in the sunlight.

Cast and characters 

 Kevin Bacon as Balto, a young adult brown-and-grey wolfdog; being a Siberian Husky-Arctic wolf hybrid. Jeffrey James Varab and Dick Zondag served as the supervising animators for Balto. Bacon is succeeded by Maurice LaMarche in the direct-to-video sequels, Balto II: Wolf Quest and Balto III: Wings of Change.
 Bob Hoskins as Boris Goosinov, a Russian snow goose and Balto's caretaker, mentor, adoptive father, and sidekick. Kristof Serrand served as the supervising animator for Boris. Hoskins is succeeded by Charles Fleischer in the sequels.
 Bridget Fonda as Jenna, a young adult female copper-and-white Siberian Husky and Rosy's pet as well as Balto's love interest. Her facial design is based on actress Audrey Hepburn. Robert Stevenhagen served as the supervising animator for Jenna. Fonda is succeeded by Jodi Benson in the sequels.
 Jim Cummings as Steele, a fierce-looking black-and-white Alaskan Malamute who bullies Balto and also has a crush on Jenna. Sahin Ersöz served as the supervising animator for Steele. Brendan Fraser was originally cast to voice Steele, before being replaced.
 Phil Collins as Muk and Luk, a pair of polar bears, Boris' adoptive nephews, and Balto's adoptive cousins. Nicolas Marlet served as the supervising animator for Muk and Luk. Collins is succeeded by Kevin Schon in the sequels.
 Juliette Brewer as Rosy, Jenna's owner and a kind, excitable girl who was the only human in Nome who was kind to Balto before his epic journey. David Bowers served as the supervising animator for Rosy. Rosy makes a brief cameo in Balto III: Wings of Change.
 Miriam Margolyes as an old Rosy in the live-action sequences who narrates her story to her granddaughter at the beginning of the film.
 Jack Angel, Danny Mann and Robbie Rist as Nikki, Kaltag, and Star, respectively. The only three prominent members of Steele's team, who later abandon him for Balto. Nikki is a reddish-brown Chow-Chow, Kaltag is a honey-yellow Chinook-esque dog, and Star is a mauve-and-cream Siberian Husky. William Salazar served as the supervising animator for the team. Nikki, Kaltag and Star make brief cameos in Balto III: Wings of Change.
 Sandra Dickinson as Dixie, a female Pomeranian and one of Jenna's friends who adores Steele until his lies are exposed by Balto returning with the medicine needed to cure the children. Dickinson also voices Sylvie, a female Afghan Hound who is also Jenna's friend; and Rosy's mother. Patrick Mate served as the supervising animator for Sylvie and Dixie. Sylvie makes a brief cameo in Balto III: Wings of Change.
 Lola Bates-Campbell as Rosy's unnamed granddaughter, who appears in the live-action sequences and is accompanied by her dog Blaze, a purebred Siberian Husky.
 William Roberts as Rosy's father
 Donald Sinden as Doc, an old St. Bernard. Doc makes a brief cameo in Balto III: Wings of Change.
 Bill Bailey as a butcher
 Garrick Hagon as a telegraph operator

Production 
Production and development on Balto began in May 1989 at Universal City Studios and Amblin Entertainment in Universal City, California, along with An American Tail: Fievel Goes West (1991) and We're Back! A Dinosaur's Story (1993). Voice-recording sessions took place at The Bridge Facilities in London (now folded into Miloco Studios and renamed The Bridge Writing Studio) between late 1992 and early 1993. Brendan Fraser was originally cast as Steele, because director Simon Wells had envisioned Steele as a school quarterback jock carried away by his sense of importance, and felt that Fraser fit that personality well. According to Wells, "I liked Brendan a great deal, and we did one recording session with him that was terrific." However, executive producer Steven Spielberg wanted a clearer sense of Steele's "inherent evil", so Fraser was replaced by Jim Cummings. Wells stated that Cummings "did a fantastic job, and totally made the character live, so I don't regret the choice."

After the actors recorded their voices, animating and filming commenced at Amblimation in London on March 1, 1993. To have a source for the dogs' character animation to be based on, the filmmakers brought in about seven Siberian Huskies and videotaped them walking around in the studio. Although most of the film's animation was hand-drawn, the animators used Toonz to improve the graphics, and also created the snowstorms using an early CGI particle animation system. Additional animation was done by the Danish studio A. Film Production. James Horner composed the film's music, including the film's only song, "Reach for the Light", sung by Steve Winwood, which plays over the film's closing credits.

The film's live-action prologue and epilogue segments were filmed in Central Park in Fall 1994. The role as elderly Rosy's granddaughter's husky, Blaze, was played by two light red blue-eyed Siberian Huskies.

Historical differences 
The film has many historical inaccuracies:
 The film portrays Balto (1919 – March 14, 1933) as a brown-and-gray wolfdog. In reality, Balto was a purebred Siberian Husky and was black and white in color. Balto's colors changed to brown due to light exposure while on display in the Cleveland Museum of Natural History.
 Balto was never an outcast street dog as shown by the film, but was instead born in a kennel owned by the famous musher and breeder Leonhard Seppala, who raised and trained him until Balto was deemed fit for being a sled dog.
 In reality, the sled run to retrieve the medicine was actually a relay. Instead of being the leader of the first and only team, Balto was scheduled to be part of the penultimate team led by dog Fox. This team left by Seppala, while driven by Gunnar Kaasen. Although they were scheduled to hand off the serum to the final team, Kaasen decided to advance on. They eventually became the last team to carry the medicine to Nome. The longest and most hazardous distance was traveled by the 18th and third-to-last team, which was led by Togo (October 17, 1913 – December 5, 1929). However, considerable controversy surrounded Balto's use as a lead dog on Kaasen's team, including many mushers and others at the time doubting the claims that he truly led the team, based primarily on the dog's track record. It was believed that at most Balto was co-lead with Seppala's dog Fox. No record exists of Seppala ever having used him as a leader in runs or races prior to 1925, and Seppala himself stated Balto "was never in a winning team", and was a "scrub dog".
 In the film, the reason why Dr. Curtis Welch orders the medicine to be sent to Nome is because his supply has completely run out. In reality, the reason was that his entire batch was past its expiration date and no longer had any effect.
 In the film, the medicine is shipped to Nenana from the Alaskan capital of Juneau, but in reality, it was shipped from Anchorage, 800 miles southeast of Nome.
 The medicine was transported in a 300,000 unit cylinder. In the film, it is transported in a large square crate. 
 In the film, the only residents of Nome who contract diphtheria are 18 children, but in reality, many more were infected, including adults. 
 In reality, none of the mushers were ever knocked unconscious.
 In the sequels, Balto becomes Jenna's mate and they have a litter of puppies who grow up and move on with their lives. In reality, however, Balto was neutered as a puppy and consequently never fathered a litter.
 In the sequels, Balto continues living in Nome along with his family and friends, but in reality, Balto and his team were sent to the Brookside Zoo (now the Cleveland Metroparks Zoo) in 1927 where they spent their last years. Balto rested there until his death on March 14, 1933, at the age of 14. After he died, his body was taxidermied and kept in the Cleveland Museum of Natural History, where it remains today.

Release 
The film was theatrically released in the United States on December 22, 1995 and then international theatres on January 13, 1996 when it first premiered in Brazil. Its release was vastly overshadowed by that of Pixar Animation Studios' first film, Toy Story, which had premiered a month earlier.

Box office 
The film ranked 15th on its opening weekend and earned $1.5 million from a total of 1,427 theaters. The film also ranked 7th among G-rated movies in 1995. Its total domestic gross was $11,348,324. Despite being a disappointment at the box-office, it was much more successful in terms of video sales. These strong video sales led to the release of two direct-to-video sequels: Balto II: Wolf Quest and Balto III: Wings of Change being created, though neither sequel received as strong a reception as the original film.

Critical reception 
On the review aggregator website Rotten Tomatoes, the film has an approval rating of 56% based on 25 reviews, with an average rating of 5.90/10. The website's critical consensus reads, "Balto is a well-meaning adventure with spirited animation, but mushy sentimentality and bland characterization keeps it at paw's length from more sophisticated family fare." Film critic Roger Ebert gave the film a positive review, describing the film as "a kids' movie, simply told, with lots of excitement and characters you can care about" and praised every thrilling scene.

Home media 

Balto was released on VHS and Laserdisc on April 2, 1996, by MCA/Universal Home Video in North America and CIC Video internationally. The VHS version was made available once more on August 11, 1998, under the Universal Family Features label.

The film was released on DVD on February 19, 2002, which includes a game, "Where is the Dog Sled Team?". This version was reprinted along with other Universal films such as An American Tail, An American Tail: Fievel Goes West and The Land Before Time. It was initially released in widescreen on Blu-ray for the first time exclusively at Walmart retailers on April 4, 2017 before its wide release on July 4, 2017.

Music 

Balto: Original Motion Picture Soundtrack  is the soundtrack of the film, composed by James Horner. The soundtrack was released on December 4, 1995 by MCA. It includes the film's only song, "Reach for the Light" performed by Steve Winwood.

Awards 
The film received five Annie Award nominations, including Best Animated Feature, but lost to Toy Story.

Sequels 
Two direct-to-video sequels of the film followed, made by Universal Cartoon Studios with their animation done overseas by the Taiwanese studio Wang Film Productions, as Amblimation had gone out of business. Due to the significantly lower budgets and different production personnel of the sequels, Kevin Bacon, Bob Hoskins, Bridget Fonda, and Phil Collins did not reprise their roles in either of them. Instead, Bacon was replaced by Maurice LaMarche as the voice of Balto, Hoskins was replaced by Charles Fleischer as the voice of Boris, Fonda was replaced by Jodi Benson as the voice of Jenna, and Collins was replaced by Kevin Schon as the voices of Muk and Luk. In addition, numerous supporting characters from the original (such as Steele, Nikki, Kaltag and Star) either did not return in the sequels or became background characters in them. The first sequel, Balto II: Wolf Quest, was released in 2002 and follows the adventures of one of Balto and Jenna's pups, Aleu, who sets off to discover her wolf heritage. The second, Balto III: Wings of Change, was released in 2004. The storyline follows the same litter of pups from Balto II, but focuses on another pup, Kodi, who is a member of a U.S. Mail dog sled delivery team, and is in danger of getting put out of his job by Duke, a pilot of a mail delivery bush plane, as characters from the first sequel could not be brought back owing to Mary Kay Bergman’s suicide in 1999, causing Balto II to be delayed for two years. Unlike the original film, neither of the sequels took any historical references from the true story of Balto and contain no live action sequences.

References

External links 

 Balto: Universal Studios – Restored version of the original 1995 official Balto site.
 
 Balto at Rotten Tomatoes
 
 
 Balto – Keyframe – the Animation Resource

1990s adventure films
1990s American animated films
1990s British animated films
1990s British films
1990s children's animated films
1990s English-language films
1990s historical adventure films
1995 animated films
1995 films
Adventure films based on actual events
Amblin Entertainment animated films
Amblin Entertainment films
American adventure films
American children's animated adventure films
American children's animated films
American films based on actual events
American films with live action and animation
American historical adventure films
Animated films about bears
Animated films about birds
Animated films about dogs
Animated films about wolves
Animated films based on actual events
British adventure films
British films set in New York City
British historical adventure films
Films based on actual events
Films directed by Simon Wells
Films scored by James Horner
Films set in 1925
Films set in Alaska
Mushing films
Northern (genre) films
Universal Pictures animated films
Universal Pictures films